Hüttnersee ("Hüttenerweiher" or "Hüttnerseeli") is a small lake at Hütten in the Canton of Zurich, Switzerland. The northern shore is located in Samstagern, a village in the municipality of Richterswil.

Lakes of Switzerland
Lakes of the canton of Zürich
LHuttnersee